Law of Ireland or Irish law may refer to:

 Early Irish law (Brehon law) of Medieval Ireland
 Alternative law in Ireland prior to 1921 
 Law of the Republic of Ireland
 Law of Northern Ireland